Mitrofan Ivanovich Nedelin (– 24 October 1960) was a Soviet military commander who served as Chief Marshal of the Artillery in the Soviet Armed Forces. A long-time member of the Red Army, Nedelin was a veteran of numerous wars and was honored as a Hero of the Soviet Union for his service during the Second World War. On 8 May 1959, Nedelin was promoted to Chief Marshal of the Artillery, and became an important figure in the development of ICBMs and the Space Race. On 24 October 1960, Nedelin was killed in an explosion at Baikonur Cosmodrome during the eponymous Nedelin catastrophe.

Early life 
Mitrofan Ivanovich Nedelin was born on November 9, 1902, in Borisoglebsk, Voronezh Governorate, Russian Empire.

Military career 
Nedelin joined the Red Army in 1920, aged 18, and fought as a volunteer in the Russian Civil War until its conclusion in 1923. The following year he joined the Communist Party of the Soviet Union, and was conscripted back into the Red Army, becoming an artillery commander. From 1937 to 1939, Nedelin fought in the Spanish Civil War as a foreign volunteer for the Republican Government, and the same year was appointed to command 13th Artillery Regiment in the Soviet Red Army.  In 1940 he was appointed to command the artillery of 160th Rifle Division after returning from Spain, and participated in the Winter War until 1940.

In 1941, after the Soviet Union entered World War II, Nedelin was appointed commander of first 4th Anti-Tank Brigade, then the artillery of 18th Army, and then the artillery of 37th Army where he stayed until 1943, before being moved to command the artillery of 56th Army.  In 1943, he was appointed Deputy Commanding Officer of the artillery of the Northern Caucasian Front.  From there Nedelin moved to command the V Artillery Corps, and then the artillery of the south-western front, and then the artillery of the 3rd Ukrainian Front where he stayed from 1943 to 1945, playing an especially important part in the capture of Hungary. In 1945, Nedelin became assistant commanding officer and then the commanding officer of the artillery of the Soviet Southern Group of Forces.

In 1946, after the end of the Second World War, Nedelin became chief of staff of the chief artillery directorate of the Soviet Army, and then chief of staff of artillery, and then deputy commander in chief of artillery. In 1948, he became head of the chief artillery directorate of the Soviet Army before becoming commander in chief of artillery from 1950 to 1952, and after a brief period as Deputy Minister of War, returned as commander in chief of artillery from 1953 to 1955. From 1955, he was Deputy Minister of Defence, and concurrently from 1959 commander in chief of the Strategic Missile Force.

Space 
During the Cold War, Nedelin inadvertently played a key role in ushering in the Space Age by concluding that rockets were the ideal means to deliver a nuclear warhead to the United States instead of bombers, and ordered Sergei Korolev to develop the massive R-7 ICBM, capable of carrying a large warhead to the United States. This rocket and its derivatives, while never an effective ICBM, was powerful enough to launch Sputnik, the world's first artificial Earth satellite, and then the Vostok manned space vehicles into orbit. These accomplishments allowed the Soviet Union to beat the United States on being the first nation to enter space, and taking a leading position during the early Space Race.

Death 
On 24 October 1960, Nedelin, along with approximately 120 other individuals, was killed in a test rocket explosion at Baikonur Cosmodrome. The incident became known as the Nedelin catastrophe, named after Nedelin due to being its most notable victim, and was covered up by the authorities. The explosion reduced his body to ashes: the only identifiable remains found were his partially melted gold star, his watch (stopped at the moment of the explosion), and one of his military shoulder boards. Nedelin's death was officially listed as having occurred in a plane crash until the collapse of the Soviet Union in the 1990s uncovered the incident.

Nedelin was buried in a tomb in the Kremlin Wall Necropolis at Red Square in Moscow. On December 20, 1999, Russian President Boris Yeltsin posthumously awarded the Order of Courage to Nedelin and the personnel who were responsible for preparing the R-16 missile.

Honors and awards 
Soviet Union and Russia
 Order of Courage (1999, posthumously)
 Hero of the Soviet Union (28 April 1945)
 Five Orders of Lenin (13 September 1944, 28 April 1945, 20 April 1956, 21 December 1957)
 Four Orders of the Red Banner (22 February 1939, 13 December 1942, 3 November 1944, 15 November 1950)
 Order of Suvorov 1st class (19 March 1944)
 Order of Kutuzov 1st class (26 October 1943)
 Order of Bogdan Khmelnitsky 1st class (18 November 1944)
 Order of the Patriotic War 1st class (3 November 1944)
 Order of the Badge of Honour (16 August 1936)
 Medal "For the Defence of the Caucasus" (1944)
 Medal "For the Capture of Budapest" (1945)
 Medal "For the Capture of Vienna"  (1945)
 Medal "For the Liberation of Belgrade" (1945)
 Jubilee Medal "XX Years of the Workers' and Peasants' Red Army" (1938)
 Jubilee Medal "30 Years of the Soviet Army and Navy" (1948)
 Jubilee Medal "40 Years of the Armed Forces of the USSR" (1958)

Foreign
Order of Military Merit (Bulgaria)
Medal of Sino-Soviet Friendship (China)
Order of Hungarian Freedom (Hungary)
Order of the Partisan Star, 1st class (Yugoslavia)

In other media 
 Marshall Nedellin appears as a character in the 2005 BBC docudrama TV series, Space Race. He is played by English actor Tim Woodward.
 Nedelin Disaster // RussianSpaceWeb.com

References

Further reading 
 "Rockets and people" – B. E. Chertok, M: "mechanical engineering", 1999.  ;
 J. K. Golovanov, M., «Korolev: Facts and myths», Nauka, 1994, ;
 "Testing of rocket and space technology - the business of my life" Events and facts - A.I. Ostashev, Korolyov, 2001.;
 «A breakthrough in space» - Konstantin Vasilyevich Gerchik, M: LLC "Veles", 1994, - ;
 «At risk» – A. A. Toul, Kaluga, "the Golden path", 2001. 
 "Top secret General" – E.T. Beloglazova, M: "the Heroes of the Fatherland", 2005. 
 "Melua, A.I." " Rocket technology, cosmonautics and artillery. Biographies of scientists and specialists.- 2nd ed., supplement, St. Petersburg: "Humanistics", 2005. С. 355. ISBN 5-86050-243-5 
 "Look back and look ahead. Notes of a military engineer" - Rjazhsky A. A., 2004, SC. first, the publishing house of the "Heroes of the Fatherland" .
 A.I. Ostashev, Sergey Pavlovich Korolyov - The Genius of the 20th Century — 2010 M. of Public Educational Institution of Higher Professional Training MGUL .
 "Unknown Baikonur" - edited by B. I. Posysaeva, M.: "globe", 2001. 
 "Rocket and space feat Baikonur" - Vladimir Порошков, the "Patriot" publishers 2007. 
 "Bank of the Universe" - edited by Boltenko A. C., Kyiv, 2014., publishing house "Phoenix", 
 "We grew hearts in Baikonur" - Author: Eliseev V. I. M: publisher OAO MPK in 2018,

External links

 Mitrofan Ivanovich Nedelin //Family history
 The newspaper Moskovsky Komsomolets  // The disaster at Baikonur 
 The official website of the city administration Baikonur // Baikonur commemorated a test rocket and space technology.
 The official website of the city administration Baikonur - Honorary citizens of Baikonur
 For the 50th anniversary of the flight of Yuri Gagarin //Press note No. 3 |Jan – APR| 2011. 

1902 births
1960 deaths
Heroes of the Soviet Union
Burials at the Kremlin Wall Necropolis
Russian military leaders
Soviet space program personnel
Baikonur Cosmodrome
People from Borisoglebsk
Recipients of the Order of Lenin
Recipients of the Order of Courage
Recipients of the Order of the Red Banner
Recipients of the Order of Kutuzov, 1st class
Recipients of the Order of Suvorov, 1st class
Recipients of the Order of Bogdan Khmelnitsky (Soviet Union), 1st class
Accidental deaths in the Soviet Union
Deaths from explosion
[[Category:Grand Crosses of the Order of Military Merit (Bulgaria)]]